Tommaso D'Attoma (born 15 April 1988 in Brescia) is an Italian footballer. He plays for F.C. AlzanoCene 1909 on loan from A.C. Lumezzane.

Career
D'Attoma started his career at Lumezzane. Despite young in age, he had made numbers of appearances in Serie C1 and Serie C2 for Lumezzane.

External links
 gazzetta.it

Italian footballers
Association football midfielders
Footballers from Brescia
1988 births
Living people
F.C. Lumezzane V.G.Z. A.S.D. players
Virtus Bergamo Alzano Seriate 1909 players